Who Ride wit Us: Tha Compalation, Vol. 2 is the third compilation album by American rapper Daz Dillinger. It was released on October 29, 2002 through D.P.G. Recordz.

Track listing
Intro—Y'All Want This Party Started feat. J-Ro
Get Yo $ feat. Albeezy, JT the Bigga Figga
Huh What feat. South Central Cartel
We Do This Passion [Remix]
Do U Wanna Roll Wit Me feat. DNA, Do'Boy
Addicted feat. Skee 64Oz
Put in Work feat. Don Cisco, Kid Frost
Ride Wit Me feat. E.S.G., Slim Thug
U Know What We Came Here 4 feat. Uncle Like, Sciryl
This Is What Happens in tha Club
Because of U Girl [OG Mix] feat. E.D.I., Storm
I Gotta Git This Money feat. DNA, Do'Boy
It's That Westcoast Way We're Livin' feat. E-40, Goldie Loc, Master P, Snoop Dogg, WC
Fucc Wit Us We Gon' Hurt Somebody! 
Tha Rep & tha Name

References

2002 compilation albums
Gangsta rap compilation albums
Daz Dillinger compilation albums
Albums produced by Prodeje
Albums produced by Mr. Mixx
Albums produced by Soopafly
Albums produced by Fredwreck
Albums produced by Big Hollis
Albums produced by Daz Dillinger